The 1946–47 season was the 55th season in Liverpool F.C.'s existence, and ended with the club winning the title by one point over Manchester United and Wolverhampton Wanderers. The chances of them doing the double was over after being beaten in the FA Cup Semi-Finals by Second Division side Burnley.

Goalkeepers

 Charlie Ashcroft
 Ray Minshull
 Cyril Sidlow

Defenders

 Tom Bush
 John Easdale
 Jim Harley
 Laurie Hughes
 Bill Jones
 George Kaye
 Ray Lambert
 Bob Paisley
 Stan Palk
 Bernard Ramsden
 Eddie Spicer
 Phil Taylor

Midfielders

 Harry Eastham
 Billy Liddell
 Doug McAvoy
 Tommy McLeod
 Alex Muir
 Berry Nieuwenhuys
 Jimmy Payne
 Robert Priday
 Billy Watkinson

Forwards

 Jack Balmer
 Kevin Baron
 Len Carney
 Cyril Done
 Willie Fagan
 Albert Stubbins

Table

Results

First Division

References
 LFC History.net – 1946–47 season
 Liverweb - 1946–47 Season

Liverpool F.C. seasons
Liverpool
English football championship-winning seasons